("Madrid stew") is a traditional chickpea-based stew from Madrid, Spain. A substantial dish prepared with meat and vegetables, it is most popular during the winter but is served throughout the year in some restaurants. Initially it was a dish for humble people, but it started to climb in society thanks to its inclusion in restaurant menus. The chickpea was introduced under Carthaginian rule, and was later used in medieval Spain. 

It is a dish normally eaten in winter, in the cold months of the year.

History
The origins of the dish are uncertain, but most sources agree that probably it was created during the Middle Ages as an evolution of the Sephardic Jewish dish adafina. Long-cooking dishes were indispensable for Jews as they allowed hearty meals during Shabbat. These first versions were kosher, using eggs and without pork. Within time, adafina was soon popular elsewhere.

The growth of anti-Semitism and the Inquisition during the 15th and 16th centuries modified the dish substantially, as the fear of being denounced as Jewish forced Christians and Marranos (converted Jews) alike to prove themselves as Christians by incorporating pork into their meals. Soon lard, bacon, chorizo (pork sausage) and morcilla (blood sausage) were added to the dish.

From these origins, the recipe allowed few modifications and was soon established as a staple of Madrid cuisine. During the growth of the city in the 19th and 20th centuries, its low cost and heartiness made it a popular order in small restaurants and the taverns catering to manual workers. After the Civil War, the austerity period, followed by the introduction of more convenient meals, reduced the public popularity of the dish.

Ingredients

The main ingredient of cocido is the chickpea or garbanzo. Vegetables are added: potatoes mainly, but also cabbage, carrots, and turnips. In some cases, green bean, Chard or cardoon are also added.

The meat used is fundamentally pork: pork belly, usually fresh, but sometimes cured (some purists even insist to a point of rancidity); fresh (unsmoked) chorizo; onion morcilla, and dried and cured jamón serrano. Beef shank is also added; the fat content (flor) of the piece is highly prized. Chicken (especially old hens) is also part of the cocido.

Two bone pieces (ham bone and beef spine bone) are added to enrich the stock.

For some recipes, the final touch is the bola, a meatball-like mix of ground beef, bread crumbs, parsley and other spices, which, it is said, was created as a substitute of the eggs used in the adafaina.

On the table

Tradition rules that the ingredients of cocido must be served separately. Each serving is known as a vuelco (tipping or emptying out), as at each time the pot must be emptied out to separate the ingredients.

The first vuelco is to separate the stock of the cocido and serve it with noodles added. The second vuelco consists of chickpeas and vegetables. The third vuelco is the meat dish.

Leftovers
Traditionally, dishes made with the leftovers of the cocido include Spanish croquetas (croquettes), ropa vieja and pringá.

See also
 Cocido lebaniego
 Cocido montañés
 Cozido à portuguesa
 Fabada asturiana
 List of stews
 Spanish cuisine

References

Culture in Madrid
Madrileño
Chickpea dishes
Spanish soups and stews
Spanish legume dishes